Pre-imperial Mali refers to the period of history before the establishment of the Mali Empire, an African empire located mostly in present-day Mali, in  1235.

Pre-imperial Mali

Written sources
There are a few sketchy references to pre-Imperial Mali in written sources. The earliest written account of pre-Imperial Mali was in the 9th century by Ahmad al-Yaqubi in his Kitab al-Buldan. In al-Bakri's reference of the Western Sudan written in 1068, he names two countries "Daw" and "Malal" located near the Niger and close to gold-fields, which are likely to be the core of the eventual Empire of Mali. Al-Bakri goes on to describe how the unnamed ruler of the kingdom was converted to Islam by a merchant when he witnessed the miraculous shower of rain that ended a drought. This event occurred at least one generation preceding 1068, since al-Bakri noted that the ruler's descendants and his nobles kept Islam, even though the common people were not converted. Ibn Khaldun, a North African historian living in Egypt interviewed shaykh Uthman, who was the faqih of Ghana and described as wise and learned. Uthman provided information on the past kings, presumably from oral tradition current in his day (1394), and named the first Muslim king Barmandana. In al-Idrisi's account of 1154, he noted that the two towns of Daw and Malal had four days' travel between them, located in a river valley that joins the Nile (by which he meant the Niger). Malal was described as a "small town, like a large village without a surrounding wall, built on an unassailable hill of red earth."

Archaeology
In 1965 and beyond a Polish archaeological team excavated at Niani, reputed to be the ancient capital of Mali. They discovered remains of buildings and other artefacts that showed a fairly intensive occupation of the site since the sixth century CE, though the site could not be classified as urban until much later, perhaps the fourteenth century. At its height, Niani comprised a number of densely occupied clusters scattered over the countryside, including a remarkable number of iron-producing sites, pointing to the town as a major industrial centre. There are also evidences of an Islamic presence, supporting the idea that there was a Muslim or commercial town and a royal town, as well as other sites. These excavations provided the strongest support for the traditional claim that a state of some complexity pre-existed the imperial period in Mali's history.

Oral traditions                           
Some of what historians have written about pre-Imperial Mali is based on oral tradition collected since the late nineteenth century. Much of the tradition focuses on the "Epic of Sunjata" a series of tales about early Mali that griots assemble into longer versions. There are several of these versions in print, the most famous of which is that of D. T. Niane, thanks to its lively narrative style and early translation into other languages. Niane's work, however, is not a literal translation of an original oral discourse, though it is surely largely based on tales told by a certain Mamadou Kouyate of Keyla. Rather, it is a reworking in literary form of Kouyate's tales. More literal versions of the tradition have since been published in French, English and Mandinka versions.

According to these traditions, the Mandinka kingdoms of Mali or Manden had already existed several centuries before Sundiata’s unification as a small state just to the south of the Soninké empire of Wagadou, better known as the Ghana Empire. This area was composed of mountains, savannah and forest providing ideal protection and resources for the population of hunters. Those not living in the mountains formed small city-states such as Toron, Ka-Ba and Niani. The Keita dynasty from which nearly every Mali emperor came traces its lineage back to Bilal, the faithful muezzin of Islam’s prophet Muhammad. Another detailed episode was told that instead of one there is three Bilal sons that departing to Manden and founding the country of Manden there, where the eldest became the first ruler

It was common practice during the Middle Ages for both Christian and Muslim rulers to tie their bloodline back to a pivotal figure in their faith’s history. Oral chroniclers have preserved a list of each Keita ruler from Lawalo (one of Bilal’s seven sons whom settled in Mali) to Maghan Kon Fatta (father of Sundiata Keita).

Chronology
The French colonial administrator and historian Maurice Delafosse was  one of the earliest Western historians to attempt a comprehensive history of the region in his book Haut-Sénégal-Niger (1912) produced a fairly detailed and exact chronology of Mali. However, he never explained how he arrived at the dates he presented there, or elsewhere, and indeed, the primary sources on which he relied did not give clear indications of chronology at that level of detail. Scholars since then, while occasionally noting the issue, have accepted this chronology and it is thus widely reported and repeated. There is little question that it is approximately correct, since the Arabic materials are fairly abundant and give a number of clues, but it would be wrong to repeat this chronology as being confirmed by original material.

The Kangaba province                   
According to modern traditions, during the height of Ghana's power, the land of Manden became one of its provinces, though the contemporary evidence of al-Bakri does not support such a large extent for Ghana's rule. According to traditions, the Manden city-state of Ka-ba (present-day Kangaba) served as the capital and name of this province. From at least the beginning of the 11th century, Mandinka kings probably known as faamas ruled Manden from Ka-ba

The twelve kingdoms                   
Modern oral traditions maintain that after the fall of Ghana the Kangaba province, splintered into twelve kingdoms with their own maghan (meaning prince) or faama. Manden was split in half with the Dodougou territory to the northeast and the Kri territory to the southwest. The tiny kingdom of Niani was one of several in the Kri area of Manden. Archaeological work places Niani, which later writers named as the capital of the country, in this region.

The Soso hegemony
According to traditions current in the fourteenth century and reported to the historian ibn Khaldun by the faqih of Ghana, shaykh Uthman in 1394, the Almoravid movement weakened Ghana, to the extent that "the authority of the rulers of Ghana dwindled away, and they were overcome by the Susu, a neighboring people of the Sudan, who subjugated and absorbed them." Traditions in Mali related that the Soso attacked and took over Mali as well, and the ruler of the Soso, Sumaouro Kanté took over the land.

Sundiata Keita
The tradition of the final emergence of Mali as an imperial power was also first revealed by shaykh Uthman, when he told ibn Khaldun that Mali emerged following its defeat of the Soso. "Their greatest king, he who overcame the Susu, conquered their country and seized their power from their hands, was named Mari Jata." The story of the rise of Sundiata (or Sunjata), as he is known modern tradition is still the most widely recited tradition among Mandinka speaking people, a group of stories concerning his reign known as the Epic of Sundiata. While there are many versions of the story, most agree that he was the son of Niani’s faama, Nare Fa (also known as Maghan Kon Fatta meaning the handsome prince). Sundiata’s mother was Maghan Kon Fatta’s second wife, Sogolon Kédjou. She was a hunchback from the land of Do, south of Mali. The child of this marriage received the first name of his mother (Sogolon) and the surname of his father (Djata). Combined in the rapidly spoken language of the Mandinka, the names formed Sondjata or Sundjata. The anglicized version of this name, Sundiata, is also popular. According to shaykh Uthman in 1394 as reported by ibn Khaldun, the name was "Mari, which in their language means 'prince of the royal line' and Jata, which means 'lion.'"

Sundiata was prophesied to become a great conqueror. To his parents' dread, the prince did not have a promising start. Sundiata, according to the oral traditions, did not walk until he was seven years old. However, once Sundiata did gain use of his legs he grew strong and very respected. Sadly for Sundiata, this did not occur before his father died. Despite the faama of Niani’s wishes to respect the prophecy and put Sundiata on the throne, the son from his first wife Sassouma Bérété was crowned instead. As soon as Sassouma’s son Dankaran Touman took the throne, he and his mother forced the increasingly popular Sundiata into exile along with his mother and two sisters. Before Dankaran Touman and his mother could enjoy their unimpeded power, King Soumaoro set his sights on Niani forcing Dankaran to flee to Kissidougou.

After many years in exile, first at the court of Wagadou and then at Mema, Sundiata was sought out by a Niani delegation and begged to combat the Sosso and free the kingdoms of Manden forever.

Battle of Kirina
Returning with the combined armies of Mema, Wagadou and all the rebellious Mandinka city-states, Sundiata led a revolt against the Kaniaga Kingdom around 1234. The combined forces of northern and southern Manden defeated the Sosso army at the Battle of Kirina (then known as Krina) in approximately 1235. This victory resulted in the fall of the Kaniaga kingdom and the rise of the Mali Empire. After the victory, King Soumaoro disappeared, and the Mandinka stormed the last of the Sosso cities. Maghan Sundiata was declared “faama of faamas” and received the title “mansa”, which translates roughly to emperor. At the age of 18, he gained authority over all the twelve kingdoms in an alliance known as the Manden Kurufa. He was crowned under the throne name Mari Djata becoming the first Mandinka emperor.

Manden Kurufa
The Mali Empire was the second in a wave of successive states forged in the Sahel and Sudan characterized by stronger and stronger centralization. Whereas the Ghana Empire had very little centralization outside of the edicts of its emperor, the Mali Empire would emerge as West Africa’s first federalized state with sweeping laws that were more or less uniform over an area roughly the size of Western Europe. This trend of centralization would be adopted and further developed by the Songhai during Mali’s decline as well as Bamana, Wolof and Fula states thereafter.

Organisation
The Manden Kurufa founded by Mari Djata I was composed of the “three freely allied states” of Mali, Mema and Wagadou plus the Twelve Doors of Mali. It is important to remember that Mali, in this sense, strictly refers to the city-state of Niani.

Mema was a powerful city-state near the bend of the Niger River outside of Manden. It was allied to Sundiata throughout his campaign against Kaniaga. Its faama (sometimes referred to as a mansa in oral traditions) was allowed to keep his crown and not prostrate before Sundiata, because of the latter’s exile at that court.

Wagadou, another land outside of Manden, was also allowed to keep its monarch. The Ghana ("warrior-king") of Wagadou received the same benefits as Mema and for the same reasons.

The twelve doors of Mali were a coalition of conquered or allied territories, mostly within Manden, with sworn allegiance to Sundiata and his descendants. Upon stabbing their spears into the ground before Sundiata’s throne, each of the twelve kings relinquished their kingdom to the Keita dynasty. In return for their submission, they became “farbas” a combination of the Mandinka words “farin” and “ba" (great farin). Farin was a general term for northern commander at the time. These farbas would rule their old kingdoms in the name of the mansa with most of the authority they held prior to joining the Manden Kurufa.

The Kouroukan Fouga
Immediately after being crowned mansa, Mari Djata instituted a universal constitution for all subjects of his new state called the Kouroukan Fouga. At a site just outside the town of Kangaba, he formalised the government and established the Gbara or Great Assembly.

The Great Assembly
The Gbara or Great Assembly would serve as the Mandinka deliberative body until the collapse of the Manden Kurufa in 1645. Its first meeting, at the famous Kouroukan Fouga (Division of the World), had 29 clan delegates presided over by a belen-tigui (master of ceremony). The final incarnation of the Gbara, according to the surviving traditions of northern Guinea, held 32 positions occupied by 28 clans.

Social, economic and governmental reform
The Kouroukan Fouga also put in place social and economic reforms including prohibitions on the maltreatment of prisoners and slaves, installing women in government circles and placing a system of banter between clans which clearly stated who could say what about in who. Also, Sundiata divided the lands amongst the people assuring everyone had a place in the empire and fixed exchange rates for common products.

Another crucial fact established at the Kouroukan Fouga was the supremacy of Manden over all realms controlled by or allied to the federation including Wagadou and Mema. All future mansas would have to be chosen from the Keita clan, and the city-state of Niani (in present-day Guinea) would become the federal capital. Mansa Mari Djata returned to and rebuilt the capital of Niani, which had been destroyed by Soumaoro in his absence, and made it the most important center of trade in West Africa for the next 200 years.

Mari Djata I
Mansa Mari Djata’s reign saw the conquest and or annexation of several key locals in the Mali Empire. When the campaigning was done, his empire extended 1,000 miles east to west with those borders being the bends of the Senegal and Niger Rivers respectively. After unifying Manden, he added the Wangara goldfields making them the southern border. The northern commercial towns of Oualata and Audaghost were also conquered and became part of the new state’s northern border. Wagadou and Mema became junior partners in the realm and part of the imperial nucleus. The lands of Bambougou, Jalo (Fouta Djallon), and Kaabu were added into Mali by Fakoli Koroma, Fran Kamara, and Tiramakhan Traore, respectively.

When Mari Djata I dies, as the result of either drowning in the Sankarani river or an errant arrow in a celebration, he had a standing army and control over the coveted trans-Saharan trade routes.

References

History of Mali
Ethnic groups in Guinea
History of Senegal